"This joyful Eastertide" is an 1894 Easter carol. The words are by George Ratcliffe Woodward, the tune is from the Netherlands (1624), and the 1894 harmonisation is by Charles Wood.

Publication
The original carol was published in 1894 in Carols for Easter and Ascensiontide, a publication put together by Woodward and Wood. They published it subsequently in 1902 in The Cowley Carol Book (second edition) and again in the Cambridge Carol Book of 1910. 

The music has been republished many times, often under choral arrangements. It appears in the Carols for Choirs collection under Wood's original arrangement. Some of the arrangements published include that of William Llewellyn published by Oxford University Press, and that of Philip Ledger. More recently, Oxford University Press published the text set to a completely new tune composed by Matthew Owens in 2015 in the form of a choral anthem.

A number of alternative versions exist, including Percy Dearmer's "How great the Harvest is"; "This Joyful Eastertide, What need is there for grieving?" and "How rich, at Eastertide", both by Fred Pratt Green; and in German, "Der schöne Ostertag" (Jurgen Henkys, 1983) and "Die frohe Osterzeit" (Friedrich Hoffmann, 1986).

Tune

It also appears as a hymn tune in Joachim Oudaen's 1685 psalter, "David's Psalmen" as a setting for "Hoe groot de vruchten zijn", a paraphrase of 1 Corinthians 15:12-23. In both instances the ascending repeats of the final line of the refrain effectively support the respective central messages of the paraphrased Bible verses. Joseph Butler, an Amsterdam municipal musician of English origin, published a number of variations for the keyboard based on the same tune.

Text
Many versions exist of the three original verses; but in its original form as written by George Ratcliffe Woodward and published in 1894, it is as follows:

Two additional verses were penned by Basilian Father M. Owen Lee:

References

External links

 arr. Sir Philip Ledger, sung by the Choir of King's College, Cambridge, 2019
 arr. Wood, sung by The Gesualdo Six, 2021

Easter hymns